DRG may refer to:

Companies 

 DRG (media company), UK, now part of Nice Entertainment Group 
 DRG Records, US
 DRG London, a Digital Audio Broadcasting multiplex
 Deutsche Reichsbahn-Gesellschaft, operating company of the German Reichs railway between 1924 and 1937
 Dickinson Robinson Group, UK stationery manufacturer

Biology 

 Dorsal respiratory group, a group of inspiratory nerves
 Dorsal root ganglion, in biology

Transport 

 Deering Airport, Alaska, US, IATA code
 Denver and Rio Grande Railroad
 Drayton Green railway station, England, station code

Other uses 

 Democratic Republic of Georgia, 1918–1921
 Diagnosis-related group, a system to classify hospital cases
 Digital raster graphic, scanned image of a map
 Deep Rock Galactic, a video game